is a 1979 Japanese anime film directed by Rintaro, based on the manga and anime television series of the same name.

Plot

The film opens in the distant future, where humanity now freely traverses space and has developed a way to transfer consciousness into mechanized robotic bodies as means to potentially obtain eternal life. Although the process of mechanization is expensive, there are rumors that anyone who makes it to the last stop of the Galaxy Express 999, an advanced intergalactic transit system resembling a passenger train pulled by a JNR Class C62 steam locomotive, can get a machine body for free. To get there is the goal of twelve-year-old street urchin Tetsuro Hoshino, living in the slums of Megalopolis City, where the 999 makes its stop on Earth for one day of each year.

Tetsuro attempts to swipe a pass for the train with the help of his friends, only to be apprehended by mechanical policemen and losing a scarab-like locket in the altercation. Before fleeing the scene, he meets a mysterious woman who bears a striking resemblance to his late mother, who collects his locket. With the police in hot pursuit, Tetsuro sees the woman again later on a balcony and faints trying to reach her. She saves him from the police and uses a device to look into his dreams, where she watches a young Tetsuro lose his mother to the villainous Count Mecha, who hunts humans for trophies. Tetsuro awakens to the sound of the woman seemingly talking to someone else in the shower, only to find her alone. He shortly thereafter learns the woman's name is Maetel and explains to her he wants a mechanical body so he can kill Count Mecha in revenge. Returning his locket, revealing it to house a photograph of his mother, Maetel offers him a ticket for the 999 under the condition that they travel together, to which Tetsuro agrees. They narrowly avoid the police once more and go to Megalopolis Station, where the train departs Earth for its journey to the Andromeda Galaxy.

The train's Conductor announces the first stop of the journey to be Saturn's moon Titan, which has been terraformed to have a hospitable atmosphere, with a layover of sixteen Earth days (roughly one day on Titan). Upon arriving, however, Tetsuro witnesses a man get murdered in broad daylight and Maetel gets kidnapped by bandits, before he himself gets knocked out. Awakening in the house of an elderly woman who saved him, Tetsuro learns that Titan is governed under "paradise law", essentially an anarchy where everyone can do as they please, and that Maetel was kidnapped by the Grape Valley Bandits. Though initially telling him not to pursue her, the old woman helps Tetsuro rescue Maetel by providing him with a hat and poncho to shield him from Titan's intense sunlight as well as a gun for self-defense, all of which belonged to her son, Tochiro Ōyama. With this, Tetsuro sets out to find Maetel and meets Antares, the leader of the Grape Valley Bandits, after saving a young girl in his care from a machine man. Antares tells Tetsuro that the gun he carries, the Warrior's Weapon, is highly effective against mechanized people and upon hearing Tetsuro is traveling on the 999 to get a machine body and kill Count Mecha, takes him in and checks him, as well as the captive Maetel, to make sure they are not mechanized. After discerning they are not, Antares shows Tetsuro and Maetel unexploded bullets still inside of him, and then shows them the many children he's caring for, all orphaned by Count Mecha. They speculate on where Count Mecha's hideout, the Time Castle, will appear next, and Antares tells Tetsuro the one person who may know is the space pirate Emeraldas, and tells Tetsuro to show no mercy when meeting Count Mecha. He lets them go free, and Tetsuro thanks the old woman who helped him before he and Maetel return to the train. She tells him to keep her son's clothes and gun, and Tetsuro promises to tell Tochiro that she is still waiting for him if he should happen to encounter him while traveling.

The next stop on their journey is Pluto, a planet where the bodies of people who died or gave up their humanity for machine bodies are kept locked in solid ice. From here, Tetsuro witnesses Maetel looking at someone under the ice, and meets a faceless machine woman named Shadow, the caretaker of the icy graves. She shows Tetsuro her original body, kept in an elegant glass casket, and reveals that her machine body is faceless because she knew no other face could be as beautiful. Then Shadow nearly freezes Tetsuro to death, clinging to him for his warmth, before Maetel intervenes and saves him, rebuking the sorrowful Shadow for being unable to decide between life as a machine woman and life as a human woman. They depart Pluto, and back on the train, make the acquaintance of a young waitress named Claire, who has a machine body made of crystal glass. Tetsuro, enamored by her beauty, strikes up a friendship with Claire, and she explains she obtained her glass body at the behest of her mother, but hopes to buy back her old body from Pluto. Shortly after this, the train is passed by the Queen Emeraldas, the spaceship of Emeraldas. Tetsuro, out of desperation, fires his gun at the ship to get Emeraldas's attention, causing her to board the ship and hold Tetsuro at gunpoint. Emeraldas stops short of killing Tetsuro after seeing Tochiro's gun in his possession, and relents completely when Maetel appears with Tochiro's hat. Tetsuro learns that Maetel and Emeraldas know each other, and that Emeraldas and Tochiro are lovers. The space pirate reluctantly informs Tetsuro that the Time Castle will appear next near Trader's Fork, a waystation on the arid planet Heavy Melder, the train's next stop. Claire pleads to the Conductor to pass Heavy Melder, but he refuses, knowing he would be fired for negligence if he did, while also recognizing Claire's concern for Tetsuro's well-being, much to her embarrassment.

At Trader's Fork, which resembles an Old West frontier town, Tetsuro finds his way to a saloon where a beautiful machine woman named Ryuzu performs a song before a tearful crowd. Tetsuro, having made a friend in the sympathetic bartender after being taunted by some of the other patrons for ordering milk, asks if the old man might know where the Time Castle will appear, sending the entire saloon into silence. The bartender cautiously takes Tetsuro into a storeroom and, after trying to warn him of the danger, tells him to venture out a ship near Mt. Gun Frontier where an eccentric who knows the answer lives. Tetsuro travels there on a ramshackle motorized bicycle and discovers a downed ship at the base of the mountain, where he encounters Tochiro living alone inside of it, with his only company being the bird Tori-san. Seeing Tetsuro with his clothes and gun and learning he knows his mother, Tochiro invites Tetsuro inside, telling the young boy that he will soon succumb to an illness he contracted while trying to chase Count Mecha across the galaxy himself. Before he can die, however, Tochiro informs Tetsuro that the Time Castle will next appear on the other side of Mt. Gun Frontier and warns him to shoot Count Mecha in his weak point; his head. Following this, he enlists Tetsuro in helping activate a machine mere moments before his death, which vaporizes his body and transfers his consciousness into the supercomputer of the Arcadia, the ship of his best friend and Tetsuro's hero, Captain Harlock. Tetsuro then erects a memorial to Tochiro and tries to make his way back to Trader's Fork, but gets assaulted by thugs from the saloon working for Count Mecha, who steal his gun and leave him for dead.

Returning to Trader's Fork, the badly beaten Tetsuro attempts to reclaim his gun, but gets pinned to the saloon floor by the largest of the thugs. However, before they can harm him further, Harlock enters the saloon and saves Tetsuro by overpowering the thug and forcing him to drink milk, which kills him by rusting him from the inside. Harlock tells Tetsuro that he saved him in return for what he did for Tochiro, and they meet up with Maetel and Emeraldas, the latter of whom leaves the scene in silence after Harlock informs her that Tochiro has died. Tetsuro then makes his way over Mt. Gun Frontier to the Time Castle, a giant technologically-advanced floating castle that can travel through space and time. He discovers, much to his horror, the taxidermied remains of his mother mounted on a fireplace inside, before encountering Count Mecha, who was alerted to Tetsuro's arrival by Ryuzu, his lover. The confrontation is briefly interrupted by a cloaked figure revealing himself to be Antares, who came to help Tetsuro fight Count Mecha in the name of his orphaned wards. The bandit buys Tetsuro enough time against Count Mecha's men for him to chase the mechanical count to the Time Castle's central computer chamber, where Tetsuro shoots off one of Count Mecha's arms before the latter calls down a glass capsule to try and safely move the Time Castle forward through time and escape. However, as Ryuzu suddenly hesitates to advance time, Antares enters to help Tetsuro, sacrificing his life when the bullets inside of him go off after being shot by Count Mecha's gun, killing him and shattering the capsule. Before he dies, however, the bandit warns Tetsuro not to trust Maetel. Tetsuro shoots Count Mecha in the head just as he attempts to advance time, killing him. Ryuzu reveals that Tetsuro reminded her of what it was like to be human, and this caused her to betray her Count Mecha, who only became a monster after being mechanized. Tetsuro then flees the Time Castle as it crumbles into dust and Ryuzu dies, her body rusting away.

Outside, Tetsuro meets with Harlock and Maetel, who question what he will do now that his mother was avenged. No longer wanting a mechanized body and seeing what rejection of one's own humanity can do to others, Tetsuro explains that his revenge will not be complete until he stops mechanization once and for all, and thereafter thanks Maetel for helping him onto the 999. The two barely make it back to the station before the train departs, and as they approach the last stop, Tetsuro asks Maetel if he can come live with her when they return to Earth. Maetel sadly reflects to herself that Tetsuro's feelings will change when he realizes who she really is. At last, the train arrives at the final station on the mechanization homeworld in Andromeda, also known as Planet Maetel. Tetsuro, horrified upon hearing the planet's name, learns why Maetel brought him to the planet; the free mechanical body offered there is that of a mechanized component of the planet itself, and Tetsuro was selected to become one, in a process Maetel, the planet's princess, has done many times over the years with countless other humans. Betrayed, Tetsuro angrily slaps Maetel, but gets incapacitated by guards who take him below the planet to be mechanized in the presence of Maetel's mother and ruler of Andromeda, Queen Promethium. However, before this can happen, Maetel, desperate to save her young companion, enters the room and reveals that she intends to destroy the planet with her pendant, which contains the consciousness of her father and Promethium's husband Dr. Pan (Dr. Ban in the English dub), a traitor who opposed the mechanized empire and also the mysterious voice Tetsuro heard back on Earth. Dr. Pan explains that the pendant contains enough energy to disrupt the planet's mechanized counterparts, all of whom were transformed willingly in the hopes of someday destroying Promethium's empire.

Though Maetel initially hesitates due to her connection to the planet, Tetsuro takes the pendant and launches it to the core of Andromeda, setting off its self-destruction. At this same time, outside, the Arcadia and Queen Emeraldas have arrived and fight back against the forces of Andromeda, as both Harlock and Emeraldas intend to ensure Tetsuro's survival. Maetel and Tetsuro barely escape with their lives aboard the 999, as Maetel explains her body is an organic copy of his mother's, and that she travels through time through cloning. Suddenly, the enraged Promethium appears and tries to strangle the life out of Tetsuro, but is interrupted by Claire, who grabs hold of the queen and self-destructs in an act of sacrifice to save Tetsuro, seemingly killing Promethium. The 999 returns to Earth, where Maetel tells Tetsuro that she will return to Pluto to be reunited with her original body and tells him that when next they meet, he may not recognize her, thereafter kissing him. Tetsuro watches sadly as the 999 then departs from Earth once again with Maetel in tow.

Cast

Additional Voices
Japanese: Kouji Totani
English (New World Pictures): Booker Bradshaw, Gary Seeger, Dicey Adams, Jill Fisher
English (Ocean Studios): Ward Perry, Karl Willems

Production
In the spring of 1978, the anime version of Leiji Matsumoto's Space Pirate Captain Harlock debuted on television produced by Toei Pictures. The TV adaptation of Galaxy Express 999 had been planned to air in the fall of 1978 after Harlock's completion. On July 14, 1978,  just three days after the 16th episode of Captain Harlock aired on TV, Farewell to Space Battleship Yamato arrived in theaters. This sequel had taken anime to even greater heights than its prior theatrical installment. Due to Leiji Matsumoto's success and popularity, plans for a film based on Galaxy Express 999 were moving forward.

Toei hadn't produced an animated hit for theaters since their 1971 feature Animal Treasure Island, and no extensive, original stories had been made since then. Even though at the time the majority of theatrical anime features like Space Battleship Yamato or Science Ninja Team Gatchaman consisted of collected or expanded TV episodes, an older range of high school viewers that had been attracted to these films were increasingly displeased with these slapped-together affairs. New stories were being called for and 999 was there at exactly the right time.

However, 999 was just starting its TV series run and the manga was nowhere close to finishing as it ran in Weekly Shōnen King until 1981. The ending of Maetel and Tetsuro's journey was a mystery, as well as the various other secrets that were hidden in the development of the story. Still, the movie version was required to be self-contained, which would result in the manga and TV anime having all the mysteries spoiled ahead of their own conclusions. Leiji Matsumoto had even considered making the feature into two films, the first ending with Tetsuro returning to Earth after getting revenge. Then, the second film having an actual conclusion for the entirety to the series.

Release
Galaxy Express 999 was released in Japan on August 4, 1979 where it was distributed by Toei Company. It was the highest grossing film of 1979 in Japan. The film was picked up for distribution in the United States by Roger Corman's New World Pictures in 1980 but was shelved until 1982 after test bookings. The film received theatrical distribution in the United States after the establishment of anime fandom in the West. The film premiered in America on August 8, 1981. The American version of the film was edited from the original 129 minute running time to 91 minutes and changed characters names such as Tetsuro Hoshino to Joey "Hana-cana-boba-camanda" Smith.

The film's second English-language adaptation was produced by Viz Media and released in 1996. The DVD version of Galaxy Express 999 was released in the United States on June 28, 2011 by Discotek Media. It feature the English subbed and dubbed (Viz dub) versions of the films.

Box office

Reception
At the third Japanese Academy Awards in 1980, Galaxy Express 999 won the Popularity award for film.

Variety referred to the film as an "attractive Japanese animated sci-fi feature" , but noted that "working in a limited animation format, the chief drawback of which is limited movement [...], the film does boast beautifully-colored, elaborate designs. Once one gets used to the lack of fluid, full animation, the imaginative visuals are impressive" and that "pic deserves a second look".

Sequel
The film was followed by Adieu Galaxy Express 999, which was released in 1981.

See also
 List of Japanese films of 1979

Footnotes

References

External links
 
 

1979 anime films
1970s science fiction films
Animated films based on animated series
Animated films based on manga
Discotek Media
Japanese animated science fiction films
Films directed by Rintaro
Toei Animation films
Animated films about trains
Trains in fiction
Transhumanism in anime and manga
Transhumanism in film